Halle Tanner Dillon Johnson (October 17, 1864 – April 26, 1901) was an American physician. She was the first black woman, as well as woman of any race, to be licensed as a physician in Alabama.

Biography

Early years
Johnson was born Halle Tanner in Pittsburgh, Pennsylvania, the oldest daughter of Benjamin Tucker Tanner and Sarah Elizabeth Tanner, who were prominent figures in the local African-American community. She was the oldest of nine siblings, four sisters, two brothers, and two siblings who died in infancy. Benjamin was a minister at the African Methodist Episcopal Church in Pittsburgh that also wrote several books, and Halle worked with him to publish the Christian Recorder, a publication of the church. Her brother was the painter Henry Ossawa Tanner. Her niece was Sadie Tanner Mossell Alexander, the first black woman in the United States to receive a Ph.D and the first president of Delta Sigma Theta.

In June 1886, she married Charles Dillon who died from pneumonia about two years after their marriage and they had a child together named Sadie in 1887. Johnson, then Halle Dillon, returned home to her family and entered the Women's Medical College of Pennsylvania at the age of 24, graduating with honors in 1891.

Around the time of her graduation, Booker T. Washington, founder of the Tuskegee Institute in Alabama, had written to the Woman's Medical College of Pennsylvania, seeking an African-American physician. Dillon accepted the offer soon after her graduation.

Later life
Johnson married a mathematics professor at Tuskegee, the Reverend John Quincy Johnson, in 1894, and she ended her career there when they moved to Columbia, South Carolina. Her husband became president of Allen University, a private school for black students. They then moved to Hartford, Connecticut, Atlanta, Georgia, and Princeton, New Jersey for his education in theology; they had three sons together, John Quincy Jr., Benjamin T., and Henry Tanner. In 1900, the Johnsons moved to Nashville, Tennessee, where John became a minister at Saint Paul's AME Church.

Death and burial 
Johnson died from dysentery during childbirth on April 26, 1901. She is buried at Nashville's Greenwood Cemetery.

Career
When Dillon got to Alabama she was tutored by Dr. Cornelius N. Dorsette to prepare for the medical exam. Dillon began her career with the Alabama state medical examination, a ten-day oral examination administered by the leading physicians of the state. She began this process by submitting her application to the board of examiners on August 17, 1891 and started the exam soon after. This rigorous exam required participants to give written responses to verbal questions from the state health office. Dr. Dillon scored a 78.81%, 3.81% higher than the requirement to pass (75%).

She was under heavy scrutiny and the public eye due to her race and gender, but successfully passed the examination to become the first woman physician in Alabama.

Johnson went on to work at Tuskegee Institute from 1891 to 1894. She also was accompanied by her father where Bishop Benjamin Tanner lectured for a year at the institute Bible School. There, her teaching schedule consisted of instructing up to two classrooms per term, teaching courses on anatomy and hygiene. Alongside that she oversaw the medical care of 480 students, families, faculty, and officers. Johnson cultivated her own medicines to treat them. This is where she was also required to compound the prescriptions for the town and institute. Her contributions at Tuskegee Institute earned her a salary of 600 dollars a year, including room and board, and was given a month of vacation each year. She founded a nursing school as well. She also practiced medicine and pharmacy in the community and founded the Lafayette Dispensary for locals.

References

1864 births
1901 deaths
Allen University
Drexel University alumni
Deaths in childbirth
People from Pittsburgh
Tuskegee University
African-American physicians
Physicians from Alabama
Woman's Medical College of Pennsylvania alumni
19th-century American women physicians
19th-century American physicians
African-American women physicians
Deaths from dysentery
Tanner family of Pennsylvania